The F-factor, in diagnostic radiology, is the conversion factor between exposure and absorbed dose. In other words, it converts between the amount of ionization in air (roentgens or, in SI units, coulombs per kilogram of absorber material) and the absorbed dose in air (rads or grays).  The two determinants of the F-factor are the effective atomic number (Z) of the material and the type of ionizing radiation being considered.  Since the effective Z of air and soft tissue is approximately the same, the F-factor is approximately 1 for many x-ray imaging applications.  However, bone has an F-factor of up to 4, due to its higher effective Z.

Radiation-related quantities
The following table shows radiation quantities in SI and non-SI units.

See also
Gray (unit)
Sievert
Equivalent dose
Relative biological effectiveness

References

Bushberg et al.,  2002.  The Essential Physics of Medical Imaging.  Philadelphia: Lippincott Williams & Wilkins. (p. 55)

Radiology